Nip/Tuck is an American medical drama created by Ryan Murphy, which aired on FX in the United States between 2003 and 2010. The series focuses on "McNamara/Troy", a plastic surgery practice, and follows its founders, Dr. Sean McNamara and Dr. Christian Troy (portrayed by Dylan Walsh and Julian McMahon respectively). Each episode typically involves the cosmetic procedures of one or more patients, and also features the personal and professional lives of its main cast.

The show began in July 2003 and concluded with the end of the sixth season in March 2010. While the show was initially set in Miami, at the end of the fourth season, the practice was relocated to Los Angeles and many of the characters followed. The fifth season premiered on October 30, 2007, though production was affected by the 2007 Writers Strike. Accordingly, the second half of the fifth season was not screened until January 6, 2009, in the U.S.

The series ran for 100 episodes, concluding with the series finale on March 3, 2010. With the exception of the pilot, each episode is named after the character(s) that are scheduled to have plastic surgery.

Series overview

Episodes

Season 1 (2003)

Season 2 (2004)

Season 3 (2005)

Season 4 (2006)

Season 5 (2007–09)

Season 6 (2009–10)

References
 "Nip/Tuck" Storylines via FX
 Episode titles via AOL

External links
 Nip/Tuck production blog
 List of Nip/Tuck episodes at TVGuide.com
 

Nip/Tuck
Nip Tuck